"Black Night" is a 1970 song by Deep Purple.

Black Night may also refer to: 

 "Black Night" (Charles Brown song), 1951 song by Charles Brown
 "Black Night" (Stratovarius song), 1989 song by Stratovarius

See also
 Blacknight, a pseudonym used exclusively by Cliff Richard to launch a remixed version of his single "Can't Keep this Feeling In" as a pre-release  
 Black knight (disambiguation)